The 2014 Grand Prix of Indianapolis, the inaugural running of the event, was an IndyCar Series race held on May 10, 2014, at the Indianapolis Motor Speedway. The fourth round of the 2014 IndyCar Series season, it was won by Simon Pagenaud of Schmidt Peterson Hamilton Motorsports.

Report

Background
The race was officially announced on October 1, 2013. The track's road course was formerly used by Formula One for the United States Grand Prix. The track featured various modifications: the track runs clockwise, with turn 1 entering the oval's turn 4 onto the road course. Turns 2 to 4 remain the same, while turn 5 and 6 became a chicane, and entered the Hulman Blvd. straight. Turn 7 is a 90-degree left turn into turns 8 and 9, leading into the oval's turn 2, which serves as the road course's turns 10 and 11. The oval's turn 1 is not entered, as the track follows the MotoGP format, with turns 12 to 14 leading into the front straight. The cars were also modified to fit the track's specifications, with fueling plugs on the opposite side.

A contest was held for fans to design the trophy for the event. Dan Nichols, a California native, beat out 150 other entries.

Qualifying
Qualifying took place on May 9. Rain had affected the track during the four sessions held. Prior to the Fast Six session, rain escalated, causing a red flag, which delayed qualifying for 20 minutes, before the six cars were sent onto the track. Ryan Hunter-Reay was the fastest during his qualifying attempt, with a lap time of 1:23.8480, but drove into a puddle of water, spinning out, bring out another red flag. As a result, Hunter-Reay was relegated to third, while Sebastián Saavedra was awarded the pole position.

Race
The race's honorary race starter was Indianapolis mayor Greg Ballard; the event began with a standing start, but as the lights went out, pole-sitter Saavedra stalled, and was later hit by Carlos Muñoz and Mikhail Aleshin.

Race results

Notes
 Due to the crash on the starting grid, all cars went through pit lane behind the safety car for the first six laps. These passages were counted as pit stops.

 Points include 1 point for leading at least 1 lap during a race, an additional 2 points for leading the most race laps, and 1 point for Pole Position.

 Mike Conway's team ordered him to park the car once he overtook James Hinchcliffe for position on the track by completing 1 more lap than him for an additional point.

 James Hinchcliffe was injured when a piece of debris hit him on the helmet knocking him unconscious. He would make a full recovery & compete in the next round.

References

Grand Prix of Indianapolis
Grand Prix of Indianapolis
Grand Prix of Indianapolis
Grand Prix of Indianapolis